Events in the year 1511 in Japan.

Incumbents
Monarch: Go-Kashiwabara

Deaths
September 6 - Ashikaga Yoshizumi (b. 1481), shōgun

References

 
1510s in Japan
Japan
Years of the 16th century in Japan